Off the Mark may refer to:

 Off the Mark (comic strip), a comic panel created by Mark Parisi
 Off the Mark (film), a 1987 American comedy film